The year 1949 in film involved some significant events.

Top-grossing films (U.S.)

The top ten 1949 released films by box office gross in North America are as follows:

Events
April 26–June 21 – Ealing comedies Passport to Pimlico, Whisky Galore! and Kind Hearts and Coronets are released in the UK, leading to 1949 being remembered as one of the peak years of the Ealing comedies.
November 15 – Following the prior year's Supreme Court decision in United States v. Paramount Pictures, Inc., Paramount Pictures is split into two separate companies with the creation of Paramount Pictures Corporation for production-distribution and United Paramount Theaters for the theater operations.
December 21 – Cecil B. DeMille's Samson and Delilah, starring Hedy Lamarr, Victor Mature, George Sanders, Angela Lansbury, and Henry Wilcoxon, receives its televised world premiere at the Paramount and Rivoli theatres in New York City. The film opens in Los Angeles on January 13, 1950, and becomes a massive commercial success. At the 23rd Academy Awards, the film wins the awards for Best Art Direction and Best Costume Design.

Awards

Top ten money making stars

Notable films released in 1949
United States unless stated

A
Abbott and Costello Meet the Killer, Boris Karloff, starring Bud Abbott and Lou Costello
The Accused, starring Loretta Young and Robert Cummings
Adam's Rib, directed by George Cukor, starring Spencer Tracy, Katharine Hepburn, David Wayne, Tom Ewell, Judy Holliday
The Adventures of Ichabod and Mr. Toad, narrated by Basil Rathbone and Bing Crosby
Africa Screams, starring Bud Abbott and Lou Costello
Alexander Popov, starring Nikolai Cherkasov – (U.S.S.R.)
Alias Nick Beal, starring Ray Milland and Audrey Totter
All the King's Men, directed by Robert Rossen, starring Broderick Crawford, John Ireland, Mercedes McCambridge
Always Leave Them Laughing, starring Milton Berle and Bert Lahr
Andaz (Style), starring Dilip Kumar and Nargis – (India)
Any Number Can Play, starring Clark Gable, Alexis Smith, Audrey Totter
Aventurera (Adventuress) – (Mexico)

B
The Bad Lord Byron, starring Dennis Price 
The Barkleys of Broadway, the last of 10 films starring Fred Astaire and Ginger Rogers
Barsaat (Rain), directed by and starring Raj Kapoor – (India)
Battleground, starring Van Johnson, Ricardo Montalbán, George Murphy
The Beautiful Blonde from Bashful Bend, starring Betty Grable
Begone Dull Care, experimental animated film featuring music of Oscar Peterson – (Canada)
Beyond the Forest, starring Bette Davis
The Big Cat, starring Lon McCallister, Preston Foster, Forrest Tucker, Peggy Ann Garner
The Big Steal, starring Robert Mitchum, Jane Greer, Patric Knowles
Bitter Rice (Riso Amaro), starring Vittorio Gassman and Silvana Mangano – (Italy)
The Blue Lagoon, starring Jean Simmons – (GB)
The Blue Swords, directed by Wolfgang Schleif (East Germany)
Border Incident, starring Ricardo Montalbán
Boys from the Streets (Gategutter) – (Norway)
The Bribe, starring Robert Taylor, Ava Gardner, Charles Laughton, Vincent Price, John Hodiak
Bride for Sale, starring Claudette Colbert and Robert Young

C
Canadian Pacific, starring Randolph Scott and Jane Wyatt
Caught, directed by Max Ophüls, starring Barbara Bel Geddes and Robert Ryan
Chains (Catene) – (Italy)
Champion, starring Kirk Douglas, Arthur Kennedy, Marilyn Maxwell
Chicken Every Sunday, directed by George Seaton, starring Dan Dailey and Celeste Holm
The Chiltern Hundreds, directed by John Paddy Carstairs – (GB)
Christopher Columbus, directed by David MacDonald, starring Fredric March – (GB)
Colorado Territory, directed by Raoul Walsh, starring Joel McCrea and Virginia Mayo
Come to the Stable, starring Loretta Young and Celeste Holm
A Connecticut Yankee in King Arthur's Court, starring Bing Crosby and Rhonda Fleming
Criss Cross, starring Burt Lancaster and Yvonne De Carlo
The Crooked Way, starring John Payne and Sonny Tufts
Crows and Sparrows (Wuya yu maque), directed by Zheng Junli – (China)

D
Dancing in the Dark, starring William Powell and Betsy Drake
A Dangerous Profession, starring George Raft and Ella Raines
Distant Journey (Daleká cesta) – (Czechoslovakia)
Down to the Sea in Ships, starring Richard Widmark and Lionel Barrymore
Dulari, starring Madhubala and Geeta Bali (India)

E
East Side, West Side, starring Barbara Stanwyck, Ava Gardner, James Mason, Van Heflin, Nancy Davis
Easy Living, starring Victor Mature and Lucille Ball
Edward, My Son, directed by George Cukor, starring Spencer Tracy and Deborah Kerr – (U.S./GB)
The Emperor of Capri (L'imperatore di Capri), directed by Luigi Comencini – (Italy)
The Emperor's Nightingale (Císařův slavík), an animated film narrated by Boris Karloff – (Czechoslovakia)
Everybody Does It, starring Paul Douglas and Linda Darnell

F
Father Was a Fullback, starring Fred MacMurray
The Fighting Kentuckian, starring John Wayne and Oliver Hardy
Flamingo Road, starring Joan Crawford
Flaxy Martin, starring Virginia Mayo
The Forbidden Street, starring Maureen O'Hara
For Them That Trespass, directed by Alberto Cavalcanti, starring Richard Todd – (GB)
The Fountainhead, directed by King Vidor, starring Gary Cooper and Patricia Neal

G
Give Us This Day, directed by Edward Dmytryk, starring Sam Wanamaker – (GB)
The Great Gatsby, starring Alan Ladd, Betty Field, Ruth Hussey
The Great Madcap (El Gran Calavera), directed by Luis Buñuel, starring Fernando Soler – (Mexico)

H
Hardly a Criminal (Apenas un delincuente), directed by Hugo Fregonese – (Argentina)
The Hasty Heart, starring Ronald Reagan and Patricia Neal – (U.S./GB)
The Heiress, directed by William Wyler, starring Olivia de Havilland, Montgomery Clift, Miriam Hopkins
Holiday Affair, starring Robert Mitchum and Janet Leigh
Home of the Brave, starring Jeff Corey
House of Strangers, directed by Joseph L. Mankiewicz, starring Edward G. Robinson, Richard Conte, Susan Hayward

I
I Married a Communist, starring Laraine Day and Robert Ryan
I Shot Jesse James, starring Preston Foster and John Ireland
I Was a Male War Bride, starring Cary Grant
Impact, starring Brian Donlevy and Ella Raines
In the Good Old Summertime, starring Judy Garland and Van Johnson
In the Name of the Law (In nome della legge), directed by Pietro Germi – (Italy)
The Inspector General, starring Danny Kaye
The Interrupted Journey, starring Richard Todd and Valerie Hobson – (GB)
Intruder in the Dust, directed by Clarence Brown
It Happens Every Spring, starring Ray Milland
It's Not Cricket directed by Alfred Roome, starring Basil Radford and Naunton Wayne – (GB)

J
Janika – (Hungary)
Johnny Stool Pigeon, starring Shelley Winters and Howard Duff
Jolson Sings Again, starring Larry Parks and Barbara Hale
Jour de fête (Festival Day), directed by and starring Jacques Tati – (France)

K
Kind Hearts and Coronets, directed by Robert Hamer, starring Alec Guinness, Dennis Price, Valerie Hobson – (GB)
A Kiss in the Dark, starring Jane Wyman and David Niven
Knock on Any Door, directed by Nicholas Ray, starring Humphrey Bogart

L
Late Spring (Banshun), directed by Yasujirō Ozu – (Japan)
Life (Vazhkai), directed by A. V. Meiyappan, starring Vyjayanthimala in her screen debut – (India)
A Letter to Three Wives, directed by Joseph L. Mankiewicz, starring Jeanne Crain, Linda Darnell, Ann Sothern, Paul Douglas, Kirk Douglas
Little Women, directed by Mervyn LeRoy, starring June Allyson, Peter Lawford, Margaret O'Brien, Elizabeth Taylor, Janet Leigh, Mary Astor
Love Happy, starring the Marx Brothers
The Lucky Stiff, starring Dorothy Lamour and Claire Trevor
Lust for Gold, starring Ida Lupino and Glenn Ford

M
Ma and Pa Kettle, starring Marjorie Main and Percy Kilbride
Madame Bovary, starring Jennifer Jones and James Mason
Mahal (The Mansion), starring Ashok Kumar and Madhubala – (India)
Malaya, starring Spencer Tracy and James Stewart
La Malquerida (The Bad Mistress), starring Dolores del Río and Pedro Armendáriz – (Mexico)
The Man from Colorado, starring Glenn Ford and William Holden
Manhandled, starring Dorothy Lamour, Dan Duryea, Sterling Hayden
Manon, directed by Henri-Georges Clouzot – (France)
 The Marriage of Figaro (Figaros Hochzeit) – (East Germany)
Mighty Joe Young, directed by Ernest B. Schoedsack, starring Terry Moore and Ben Johnson
Miss Mink of 1949, starring Lois Collier
Mother Is a Freshman, starring Loretta Young and Van Johnson
My Foolish Heart, starring Susan Hayward and Dana Andrews
My Friend Irma, film debut of Dean Martin and Jerry Lewis

N
Neptune's Daughter, starring Esther Williams
Never Fear, directed by Ida Lupino, starring Sally Forrest and Hugh O'Brian
Night Unto Night, directed by Don Siegel, starring Ronald Reagan
No Way Back, starring Terence De Marney, Eleanor Summerfield – (GB)

O
Obsession, directed by Edward Dmytryk, starring Robert Newton – (GB)
Oh, You Beautiful Doll, starring June Haver
On the Town, starring Gene Kelly, Frank Sinatra, Vera-Ellen, Ann Miller, Betty Garrett

P
The Passionate Friends, directed by David Lean, starring Ann Todd and Claude Rains – (GB)
Passport to Pimlico, starring Stanley Holloway and Margaret Rutherford – (GB)
Pinky, starring Jeanne Crain
Prince of Foxes, starring Tyrone Power and Orson Welles
Prison (Fängelse), directed by Ingmar Bergman – (Sweden)

Q
The Queen of Spades, starring Anton Walbrook and Edith Evans – (GB)
The Quiet Duel (Shizukanaru Ketto), starring Toshiro Mifune – (Japan)

R
The Reckless Moment, starring James Mason and Joan Bennett
Red, Hot and Blue, starring Betty Hutton and Victor Mature
Red Light, starring George Raft and Virginia Mayo
The Red Pony, starring Myrna Loy and Robert Mitchum
The Rocking Horse Winner, starring Valerie Hobson and John Howard Davies – (GB)
Rope of Sand, starring Burt Lancaster, Paul Henreid, Claude Rains
Rotation (Sowjetische Zone) – (East Germany)
A Run for Your Money, starring Donald Houston, Moira Lister, Alec Guinness – (GB)
Rustlers, starring Tim Holt and Martha Hyer

S
Samson and Delilah, directed by Cecil B. DeMille, starring Hedy Lamarr and Victor Mature
Sands of Iwo Jima, directed by Allan Dwan, starring John Wayne
The Secret Garden, starring Margaret O'Brien and Herbert Marshall
The Set-Up, starring Robert Ryan
She Wore a Yellow Ribbon, starring John Wayne, Joanne Dru, Ben Johnson
Shockproof, starring Cornel Wilde
Une si jolie petite plage (Such a Pretty Little Beach), directed by Yves Allégret – (France)
Le Silence de la mer, directed by Jean-Pierre Melville – (France)
Slattery's Hurricane, starring Richard Widmark, Veronica Lake, Linda Darnell
The Small Back Room, directed by Michael Powell and Emeric Pressburger – (GB)
Sons of Matthew (aka The Rugged O'Riordans) – (Australia)
Sorrowful Jones, starring Bob Hope and Lucille Ball
South of St. Louis, starring Joel McCrea and Alexis Smith
The Stratton Story, starring James Stewart and June Allyson
Stray Dog (Nora inu), directed by Akira Kurosawa, starring Toshiro Mifune – (Japan)
Streets of Laredo, starring William Holden, Macdonald Carey, William Bendix
The Sun Comes Up, starring Jeanette MacDonald, Lloyd Nolan, Lassie

T
Take One False Step, starring Shelley Winters and William Powell
Tension, starring Richard Basehart, Audrey Totter, Cyd Charisse
That Dangerous Age, starring Myrna Loy and Peggy Cummins – (GB)
That Forsyte Woman, starring Greer Garson and Walter Pidgeon
That Midnight Kiss, starring Kathryn Grayson and Mario Lanza
Thieves' Highway, directed by Jules Dassin, starring Richard Conte
The Third Man, directed by Carol Reed, starring Joseph Cotten, Alida Valli, Trevor Howard, Orson Welles – (GB)
Too Late for Tears, starring Lizabeth Scott and Dan Duryea
Train of Events, starring Valerie Hobson, Jack Warner, Peter Finch – (GB)
Tulsa, starring Susan Hayward and Robert Preston
Twelve O'Clock High, starring Gregory Peck

U
Under Capricorn, directed by Alfred Hitchcock, starring Ingrid Bergman – (GB)
The Undercover Man, starring Glenn Ford and Nina Foch

W
Waga koi wa moenu (Flame of My Love), directed by Kenji Mizoguchi – (Japan)
The Walls of Malapaga (Au-delà des grilles), directed by René Clément, starring Jean Gabin – (France/Italy)
We Were Strangers, starring Jennifer Jones and John Garfield
Whirlpool, directed by Otto Preminger, starring Gene Tierney
Whisky Galore!, directed by Alexander Mackendrick (debut), starring Basil Radford and Joan Greenwood – (GB)
White Heat, directed by Raoul Walsh, starring James Cagney, Virginia Mayo, Edmond O'Brien
The Window, starring Barbara Hale and Arthur Kennedy
Without Honor, starring Laraine Day
Women Side by Side, directed by Chen Liting, starring Shangguan Yunzhu and Zhao Dan – (China)

Y
You, the Rich (Ustedes los ricos), starring Pedro Infante – (Mexico)
You're My Everything, directed by Walter Lang, starring Dan Dailey and Anne Baxter

Serials
Adventures of Sir Galahad, starring George Reeves and Charles King
Batman and Robin, starring Robert Lowery
Bruce Gentry, starring Tom Neal
Federal Agents vs. Underworld, Inc, starring Kirk Alyn and Rosemary LaPlanche
Ghost of Zorro, starring Clayton Moore and Pamela Blake
The James Brothers of Missouri, starring Keith Richards and Noel Neill
King of the Rocket Men, starring Tristram Coffin and Mae Clarke
Radar Patrol vs Spy King, starring Kirk Alyn

Short film series
Mickey Mouse (1928–1952)
Looney Tunes (1930–1969)
Merrie Melodies (1931–1969)
Popeye (1933–1957)
Color Rhapsodies (1934–1949)
The Three Stooges (1934–1959)
Donald Duck (1934–1956)
Pluto (1937–1951)
Chip and Dale (1943–1956)
Andy Panda (1939–1949)
Goofy (1939–1953)
Tom and Jerry (1940–1958)
The Fox and the Crow (1941–1950)
Woody Woodpecker (1941–1949)
Mighty Mouse (1942–1955)
Droopy (1943–1958)
Blackie the Sheep (1947–1949)
Red Hot Riding Hood (1943–1949)
Jan Wickman Shorts (1949–1994)
Noveltoons (1943–1967)

Births
Mbissine Thérèse Diop, Senegalese actress
January 7
George Buza, American-born Canadian actor
Steven Williams, American actor
January 9 - Vincent Grass, Belgian actor
January 12 – Wayne Wang, Hong Kong-born director
January 14 – Lawrence Kasdan, American director and screenwriter
January 16 – Caroline Munro, English actress and model
January 17 – Andy Kaufman, American actor and comedian (died 1984)
January 24 – John Belushi, American actor and comedian (died 1982)
January 26 - David Strathairn, American actor
January 27 – Zbigniew Rybczyński, Polish film and video cinematographer and director
February 2 - Brent Spiner, American actor, comedian and musician
February 8 – Brooke Adams, American actress
March 3 - Gloria Hendry, American actress and former model
March 12 – Rob Cohen, American director, producer and writer
March 16 – Victor Garber, Canadian actor
March 22 – Fanny Ardant, French actress
April 2
Ron Palillo, American actor (died 2012)
Pamela Reed, American actress
April 8 - Brian Delate, American actor
April 11 - Bernd Eichinger, German producer, director and screenwriter (died 2011)
April 14 – John Shea, American actor
April 20 
Jessica Lange, American actress
Veronica Cartwright, English-born actress
April 21 - Patti LuPone, American actress and singer
April 26 - Dominic Sena, American director
April 28 - Bruno Kirby, American actor, singer, voice artist and comedian (died 2006)
May 7 - Marilyn Burns, American actress (died 2014)
May 18 - Hubert Saint-Macary, French actor
May 20 - Dave Thomas, Canadian comedian, actor and television writer
May 21 - Will Ryan, American voice actor, singer and musician (died 2021)
May 24 – Jim Broadbent, English actor
May 25 - Joe Unger, American actor
May 26
Pam Grier, American actress
Philip Michael Thomas, American retired actor and musician
May 28 - Sandy Helberg, German-born American actor
May 29  - Cotter Smith, American actor
May 31 – Tom Berenger, American actor
June 10 - Frankie Faison, American actor
June 15
Simon Callow, English actor, director and writer
Jim Varney, American actor and comedian (died 2000)
June 22 – Meryl Streep, American actress
June 29 - Greg Burson, American voice actor (died 2008)
July 5 - Ed O'Ross, American actor
July 7  – Shelley Duvall, American actress
July 12
Diana Hardcastle, English actress
Bernice Stegers, English actress
July 24 - Michael Richards, American actor, writer, producer and retired comedian
July 27
Maury Chaykin, American-Canadian actor (died 2010)
Susan Gordon, American child actress (died 2011)
August 2 - Madeline Smith, English actress
August 8 – Keith Carradine, American actor
August 17 – Julian Fellowes, English actor, writer, director and screenwriter
August 20 - Patrick Kilpatrick, American actor, director and screenwriter
August 21 – Loretta Devine, American actress
August 23 – Shelley Long, American actress
August 25 – John Savage, American actor
August 31 – Richard Gere, American actor
September 1 – Luminița Gheorghiu, Romanian actress (died 2021)
September 4 – Eero Spriit, Estonian actor and producer
September 16 – Ed Begley, Jr., American actor
September 18 - Beth Grant, American character actress
September 19 - Ernie Sabella, American actor
September 25 – Pedro Almodóvar, Spanish director
October 4 – Armand Assante, American actor
October 8 – Sigourney Weaver, American actress
October 10 – Jessica Harper, American actress
October 15 – Tanya Roberts, American actress (d. 2021)
October 20 - George Harris (actor), British actor
October 21 - LaTanya Richardson Jackson, American actress
November 10 - Ann Reinking, American actress and singer (died 2020)
November 27 - Gerrit Graham, American actor
November 28 – Alexander Godunov, Russian-American film actor (died 1995)
November 29 – Garry Shandling, American stand-up comedian, actor, director, writer and producer (died 2016)
November 30
Margaret Whitton, American actress (died 2016)
Nicholas Woodeson, English actor
December 3 - Heather Menzies, Canadian-American actress (died 2017)
December 4 – Jeff Bridges, American actor
December 7 - Tom Waits, American musician and actor
December 8 - Nancy Meyers, American filmmaker
December 12 – Bill Nighy, English actor
December 13 - Robert Lindsay (actor), English actor
December 15 – Don Johnson, American actor
December 21 - Michael Horse, American actor
December 22 - Graham Beckel, American character actor
December 25 – Sissy Spacek, American actress

Deaths
January 6 – Victor Fleming, 59, American director and producer, The Wizard of Oz, Gone With the Wind, Captains Courageous, Dr. Jekyll and Mr. Hyde
January 19 – William Wright, 38, American actor, Philo Vance Returns, Eve Knew Her Apples
January 20 – Nora Gregor, 47, Austrian actress, The Rules of the Game, But the Flesh Is Weak
February 19 – Jean Gillie, 33, English actress, Decoy
March 16 – Leyland Hodgson, 56, English actor, Under Nevada Skies, Kiss the Blood Off My Hands
April 15 – Wallace Beery, 64, American actor, Grand Hotel, The Champ, Robin Hood, Viva Villa!
April 18 – Will Hay, 60, English comedian, actor and director, Oh, Mr. Porter!, Hey! Hey! USA 
April 22 – Charles B. Middleton, 74, American actor (born 1874), Flash Gordon
August 9 – Harry Davenport, 83, American actor (born 1866), Gone with the Wind, The Ox-Bow Incident
September 4 – Olof Ås, 56, Swedish actor, stage manager (born 1892)
September 10 – Robert Middlemass, 66, American playwright, actor, (born 1883), Lady in the Death House, A Sporting Chance
September 14 – Romuald Joubé, 73, French actor (born 1876)
September 18 – Frank Morgan, 59, American actor (born 1890), The Wizard of Oz
September 20 – Richard Dix, 56, American actor (born 1893), Cimarron, Redskin
October 14 – Fritz Leiber, Sr., 67, American actor (born 1882)
October 22 – Craig Reynolds, 72, American actor (born 1907), Gold Mine in the Sky, Slander House
November 25 – Bill Robinson, 72, American dancer and actor (born 1878), Stormy Weather, The Little Colonel
November 27 – Tom Walls, 66, English actor and director (born 1883), Stormy Weather, Lady in Danger
December 16 – Sidney Olcott, 76, Canadian-born American film director (born 1873)
December 31 – Howard Hickman, 69, American actor, director, writer (born 1880), The Kansas Terrors, Gone with the Wind

Film debuts 
Julie Andrews – The Singing Princess
Neville Brand – Battleground
Yul Brynner – Port of New York
Richard Burton – The Last Days of Dolwyn
Tony Curtis – Criss Cross
Denholm Elliott – Dear Mr. Prohack
Jerry Lewis – My Friend Irma
Dean Martin – My Friend Irma
Jeanne Moreau – Last Love
Patricia Neal – John Loves Mary
Philippe Noiret – Gigi
Vito Scotti – Criss Cross
Joe Turkel – City Across the River
Max von Sydow – Only a Mother
James Whitmore – The Undercover Man
Nimmi - Barsaat (1949 film)

References

 
Film by year